Coleophora lativittella is a moth of the family Coleophoridae. It is found in Irkutsk, Russia.

References

lativittella
Moths described in 1877
Moths of Asia